Boneh Var-e Baba Ahmadi (also Romanized as Boneh Vār-e Bābā Aḩmadī; also known as Boned Vār-e Bābā Aḩmadī and Boneh Vār) is a village in Sadat Rural District, in the Central District of Lali County, Khuzestan Province, Iran. At the 2006 census, its population was 113, in 23 families.

References 

Populated places in Lali County